Norshen is a village in the Ani Municipality of the Shirak Province of Armenia.

Demographics

References 

Communities in Shirak Province
Populated places in Shirak Province